Alsen is a city in Cavalier County, North Dakota, United States. The population was 32 at the 2020 census. Alsen was founded in 1905.

Geography

Despite the small number of residents, Alsen and nearby Loma each cover approximately as much land within their corporate boundaries as Minot.

Demographics

2010 census
As of the census of 2010, there were 35 people, 16 households, and 11 families residing in the city. The racial makeup of the city was 100.0% White.

There were 16 households, of which 31.3% had children under the age of 18 living with them, 56.3% were married couples living together, 6.3% had a female householder with no husband present, 6.3% had a male householder with no wife present, and 31.3% were non-families. 25.0% of all households were made up of individuals, and 12.6% had someone living alone who was 65 years of age or older. The average household size was 2.19 and the average family size was 2.64.

The median age in the city was 50.8 years. 22.9% of residents were under the age of 18; 0.0% were between the ages of 18 and 24; 17.2% were from 25 to 44; 25.7% were from 45 to 64; and 34.3% were 65 years of age or older. The gender makeup of the city was 54.3% male and 45.7% female.

2000 census
As of the census of 2000, there were 68 people, 25 households, and 19 families residing in the city. The population density was 2.3 people per square mile (0.9/km2). There were 45 housing units at an average density of 1.5 per square mile (0.6/km2). The racial makeup of the city was 97.06% White, and 2.94% from two or more races. Hispanic or Latino of any race were 1.47% of the population.

There were 25 households, out of which 32.0% had children under the age of 18 living with them, 64.0% were married couples living together, 8.0% had a female householder with no husband present, and 24.0% were non-families. 20.0% of all households were made up of individuals, and 12.0% had someone living alone who was 65 years of age or older. The average household size was 2.72 and the average family size was 3.21.

In the city, the population was spread out, with 32.4% under the age of 18, 2.9% from 18 to 24, 27.9% from 25 to 44, 23.5% from 45 to 64, and 13.2% who were 65 years of age or older. The median age was 41 years. For every 100 females, there were 106.1 males. For every 100 females age 18 and over, there were 100.0 males.

The median income for a household in the city was $57,500, and the median income for a family was $65,000. Males had a median income of $51,250 versus $41,250 for females. The per capita income for the city was $12,982. There were 22.7% of families and 44.2% of the population living below the poverty line, including 70.6% of under eighteens and 28.6% of those over 64.

History

The former high school in Alsen, which closed due to low enrollment in 1980, recorded the longest basketball winning streak in North Dakota basketball history, at 79 games from 1956 to 1959.

References

Cities in Cavalier County, North Dakota
Cities in North Dakota
Populated places established in 1905
1905 establishments in North Dakota